Kalat-e Jangal (also Romanized as Kalāt-e Jangal; also known as Jangal and Kalāteh-ye Jangal) is a village in Meyghan Rural District, in the Central District of Nehbandan County, South Khorasan Province, Iran. At the 2006 census, its population was 55, in 15 families.

References 

Populated places in Nehbandan County